John Deere: American Farmer is a farm construction and management simulation for Microsoft Windows featuring the John Deere license, developed by Gabriel Entertainment, published by Destineer Studios.

Gameplay
In the game, players must establish and maintain a successful farm.

Development
The game was in development for nearly a year.

Sequel
In 2006 a sequel, John Deere: American Farmer Deluxe was released.

References

External links
 
 John Deere: American Farmer at Bold Games
 John Deere: North American Farmer at Bold Games

2004 video games
Business simulation games
Farming video games
John Deere
North America-exclusive video games
Video games developed in the United States
Windows games
Windows-only games
Gabriel Entertainment games